The 2023 Pac-12 Conference men's basketball tournament is a postseason men's basketball tournament for the Pac-12 Conference held March 8–11, 2023, at T-Mobile Arena on the Las Vegas Strip in Paradise, Nevada.  The tournament winner of the conference tournament, Arizona, received the conference's automatic bid to the NCAA tournament.

Seeds

The bracket will be set in March 2023.  All 12 schools are scheduled to participate in the tournament. The seedings will be determined upon completion of regular season play.  The winning percentage of the teams in conference play determined tournament seedings. There are tiebreakers in place to seed teams with identical conference records. The top four teams receive a bye to the quarterfinals.  Tie-breaking procedures for determining all tournament seeding is:
For two-team tie:
 Results of head-to-head competition during the regular season.
 Each team's record (won-lost percentage) vs. the team occupying the highest position in the final regular standings, and then continuing down through the standings until one team gains an advantage. When arriving at another group of tied teams while comparing records, use each team's record (won-lost percentage) against the collective tied teams as a group (prior to that group's own tie-breaking procedure), rather than the performance against individual tied teams.
 Won-lost percentage against all Division I opponents.
 Coin toss conducted by the Commissioner or designee.
For multiple-team tie:
 Results (won-lost percentage) of collective head-to-head competition during the regular season among the tied teams.
 If more than two teams are still tied, each of the tied team's record (won-lost percentage) vs. the team occupying the highest position in the final regular season standings, and then continuing down through the standings, eliminating teams with inferior records, until one team gains an advantage.When arriving at another group of tied teams while comparing records, use each team's record (won-lost percentage) against the collective tied teams as a group (prior to that group's own tie-breaking procedure), rather than the performance against individual tied teams. After one team has an advantage and is seeded, all remaining teams in the multiple-team tie-breaker will repeat the multiple-team tie-breaking procedure. If at any point the multiple-team tie is reduced to two teams, the two-team tie-breaking procedure will be applied.
 Won-lost percentage against all Division I opponents.
 Coin toss conducted by the Commissioner or designee.

Schedule

Bracket
* denotes overtime period

Game statistics

First round

Quarterfinals

Semifinals

Championship

Awards and honors

Hall of Honor 
The 2023 class of the Pac-12 Hall of Honor will be honored on March 3 during the 2023 Women's Tournament during a ceremony prior to the tournament semifinals.  The 2023 class will be the first ever all-female class inducted into the Hall of Honor in recognition of the 50th anniversary of the passage of Title IX.  The class includes: 

 Susie Parra (Arizona Softball)
 Jackie Johnson-Powell (Arizona State Women's Track & Field)
 Dr. Luella Lilly (California Athletic Director)
 Ceal Barry (Colorado Women's Basketball Coach & Administrator)
 Janie Takeda Reed (Oregon Softball)
  Dr. Mary Budke (Oregon State Women's Golf)
 Jessica Mendoza (Stanford Softball)
 Natalie Williams (UCLA Women's Basketball & Volleyball)
 Barbara Hallquist DeGroot (USC Women's Tennis)
 Kim Gaucher (Utah Women's Basketball)
 Danielle Lawrie (Washington Softball)
 Sarah Silvernail (Washington State Women's Volleyball)

Team and tournament leaders
Source:

All-Tournament Team

Most Outstanding Player

Tournament notes

The following teams at the start of the tournament, No. 2 UCLA & No. 8 Arizona were ranked in the top 25.
The following were extended invitations to the 2023 NCAA tournament: Arizona, Arizona State, UCLA & USC.
The following teams were extended invitations to the 2023 National Invitation Tournament: Colorado, Oregon & Washington State

See also

2023 Pac-12 Conference women's basketball tournament

References

Pac-12 Conference men's basketball tournament
Tournament
Basketball competitions in the Las Vegas Valley
College basketball tournaments in Nevada
Pac-12 Conference men's basketball tournament
College sports tournaments in Nevada